Four referendums were held in Switzerland in 1983. The first two were held on changes to fuel tax and the article in the Swiss Federal Constitution on energy. Whilst they were both approved by voters, the constitutional amendment failed to receive the support of a majority of cantons, so was rejected. The last two were held on 3 December on changes to the civil rights regulations, which were approved, and on allowing certain types of naturalisation, which was rejected.

Results

February: Fuel tax

February: Constitutional amendment on energy

December: Civil rights regulations

December: Allowing certain types of naturalisation

References

1983 referendums
1983 in Switzerland
Referendums in Switzerland